Drugi Način (trans. The Other Way) is a former Yugoslav rock band.

Band history

1970s and 1980s 
In the first half of the 1970s Branko Požgajec (vocals, keyboard, flute), Halil Mekić (guitar) and Vjekoslav Poldrugac (bass guitar) performed in the reformed Novi Akordi (trans. New Chords). After Mekić left the band due to his army obligations, Ismet Kurtović (vocals, guitar, flute) joined the band. This lineup released single with songs "Opet" and "Odlazak" and went on a tour. In July 1974 they were joined by Boris Turina (drums), who decided to leave a career of a table tennis player and dedicate himself to music. Turina previously wrote lyrics for several songs of Crveni Koralji and performed with Crveni Koralji and the first lineup of Zlatni Akordi. As this lineup of the band did not feature any original member of Zlatni Akordi, the members decided to rename themselves to Novi Akordi (New Chords), and in October 1974 adopted the name Drugi Način (The Other Way). The band members chose their name after a poem by Federico García Lorca and the band's logo was designed by comic book author Igor Kordey.

The band started to hold regular concerts at the music club Big Ben in Zagreb, and at the end of 1974 they recorded their debut album. The record label Jugoton from Zagreb did not want to sign the band, and the members broke the contract with another Zagreb-based record label, Suzy, because of disagreement about the album cover. Finally, the band signed for PGP-RTB from Belgrade, only because one of the editors liked the album artwork and decided to offer Drugi Način a contract without even listening to the album. Drugi Način, released in 1975, was a concept album with music influenced by Wishbone Ash, Deep Purple and Free and lyrics dealing with solitude. The music was written by Požgajec and Kurtović and the lyrics were written by Turina.

And the end of 1976 Požgajec left the band due to his army obligations, and during his absence guitarists Kurtović and Mekić left Drugi Način and formed the band Nepočin. After Požgajac returned from the army Drugi Način continued their activity with guitarists Branko Bogunovič and Nikola Gečević. This lineup released several singles, before Turina, Bogunović and Gečević left the band. Having left Drugi Način Gečević formed Žuta Minuta and later a better-known band Regata. Drummer Miroslav Budanko and guitarist Robert Krkač joined Drugi Način, and soon after Ismet Kurtović returned to the band, bringing bassist Boža Ilić. After Krkač joined Film, Danijel Veličan became Drugi Način's new member. In 1982 this lineup released album Ponovo na putu (On the Road again) which did not gain the popularity of the band's previous album, but the band continued to perform actively until the second half of the 1980s when the band went on hiatus and performed occasionally only until 1990.

1990s and 2000s 
In 1992 Branko Požgajec, with Ilić, Davor Senčar (a former Legija member, guitar) and Dražen Kovač (a former Regata member, drums) rerecorded some of the old Drugi Način songs and released them, with two new songs, on the compilation album Drugi Način. Guitarist Ernest Vinković and keyboardist Branko Bardun also participated in the album recording. Debut albums of Drugi Način and Nepočin were reissued on the CD Drugi Način + Nepočin. In May 2000 Drugi Način performed as the opening act on the Jethro Tull concert in Zagreb, after which they disbanded once again. In 2008, the band reunited in the new lineup, consisting of Branko Požgejac (flute, vocals), Boža Ilić (bass guitar), Damir Vuk (keyboards), Mladen Palenkaš (drums), and Mario Domazet (guitar).

In 2011, Davor Senčar died at the age of 52, after illness.

Legacy
The album Drugi Način was polled in 1998 as 88th on the list of 100 greatest Yugoslav popular music albums in the book YU 100: najbolji albumi jugoslovenske rok i pop muzike (YU 100: The Best albums of Yugoslav pop and rock music).

In 2011, the band's song "Stari grad" ("Old Town") was polled, by the listeners of Radio 202, one of 60 greatest songs released by PGP-RTB/PGP-RTS.

Discography

Studio albums 
Drugi Način (1975)
Ponovo na putu (1982)

Compilations 
Drugi Način (1992)

Singles 
"Opet" / "Odlazak" (as Novi Akordi, 1973)
"Dugi put" / "Izgubljena žena" (1975)
"Jugoslavija" / "Crnogorsko kolo" (1976)
"Prođe ovaj dan" / "Zadnji put" (1978)
"Obećaj mi proljeće" / "Balada o osmijehu" (1979)

References 

EX YU ROCK enciklopedija 1960-2006, Janjatović Petar; 

Croatian rock music groups
Yugoslav hard rock musical groups
Croatian progressive rock groups
Musical groups established in 1974
Yugoslav rock music groups
Musicians from Zagreb